Trần Huỳnh Duy Thức (born 29 November 1966) is a Vietnamese engineer, entrepreneur and human rights activist. He was the founder and president of EIS, an international internet and telephone line provider. He is one of Amnesty International's prisoners of conscience.

EIS
Thức opened EIS as a computer shop in 1993 which assembled its own computers, and by 1994 the brand dominated the home PC market in Ho Chi Minh City. Later on it became an internet service provider, and in 1998 became the first Vietnamese ISP to branch out from dial-up to an integrated services digital network.

EIS started providing Voice over IP services in Vietnam in 2003. They developed subsidiaries, One-Connection Singapore, One-Connection USA / Innfex, One-Connection Malaysia and One-Connection Vietnam, to provide internet access and telephone lines internationally.

One-Connection Vietnam's operation license was withdrawn following Thức's arrest.

Activism
He began blogging under the pen name of Tran Dong Chan after he received no response to letters he had written to senior government officials.

In 2008 he started co-writing "The Path of Viet Nam", which assessed the current situation in Vietnam, with a comprehensive set of recommendations for governance reform centred on human rights.

Arrest and imprisonment
He was arrested in 2009, initially for "theft of telephone wires", and later for "conducting propaganda" against the state. He made a televised confession but later recanted, saying he was coerced.

In 2010 he was tried in day-long trial alongside fellow dissidents Lê Công Định, Nguyễn Tiến Trung and Le Thang Long. Amnesty International called the trial "a mockery of justice" and said the "trial allowed no meaningful defence for the accused". The trial judges deliberated for 15 minutes before returning with the judgment, which took 45 minutes to read. Amnesty International said the judgement had clearly been prepared in advance of the hearing. He could have received the death penalty.

He was imprisoned for 16 years, followed by five years house arrest, for "activities aimed at subverting the people's administration". His sentence was the longest ever passed on a Vietnamese dissident. His imprisonment was condemned by British Foreign Office Minister Ivan Lewis and American ambassador Michael W. Michalak. The Office of the United Nations High Commissioner for Human Rights concluded his detention was arbitrary and requested the Vietnamese government to release him and provide compensation. Amnesty International declared him a prisoner of conscience and called for his release. He led hunger strikes in prison. He had been offered release in exchange for permanent exile, but doesn't want to leave Vietnam.

Personal life
Thức is married with two daughters.

See also 
 Human rights in Vietnam
 Internet censorship in Vietnam

References

External links
 Official website
 Facebook campaign
 Family blog

Amnesty International prisoners of conscience held by Vietnam
1966 births
Political repression in Vietnam
Victims of human rights abuses
Vietnamese democracy activists
Vietnamese dissidents
Vietnamese human rights activists
Living people
Vietnamese prisoners and detainees